The Toronto Regional Real Estate Board (TRREB), formerly the Toronto Real Estate Board (TREB), is a non-profit professional association of registered real estate brokers and salespeople in and about the Greater Toronto Area. TRREB's Toronto office is located at 1400 Don Mills Road.

TRREB was formed in 1920, and 100 years after its formation, in January 2020, the name was changed from Toronto Real Estate Board.

Multiple Listing Service

Toronto's Co-operative Listing System was first created in 1924, but only lasted 8 months. Later, in 1944, its Multiple Listing Service was established, and was computerized in 1974.

TRREB currently utilizes Stratus software to allow members to enter and manage their Multiple Listing Service(R) listings.

In April 2021, TRREB announced it would stop using the word "master" when referencing main bedrooms in homes, because the word "is often seen as a reference to racism, sexism and slavery".

Members
TRREB currently has over 68,000 Realtor members, the most of any real estate association in Canada.

Members of TRREB are licensed by the Real Estate Council of Ontario (RECO) to trade in real estate in Ontario.

Members and member offices can be found by using the search function on the home page of its website. All members of the Board are also members of the Ontario Real Estate Association and Canadian Real Estate Association, and as such, are permitted to use the term REALTOR. The REALTOR and MLS trademarks are owned by the Canadian Real Estate Association (CREA).

See also
Canadian Real Estate Association
Ontario Real Estate Association

References

External links
 Toronto Regional Real Estate Board public website
 Toronto Regional Real Estate Board listing search

Real estate industry trade groups based in Canada
Trade associations based in Ontario
Economy of Toronto
Real Estate Board
1920 establishments in Ontario